One of the Family (1993) was the last novel written by Monica Dickens, the great granddaughter of Charles Dickens.  It is set in Edwardian London where the world, like main character Leonard Morley's life, is changing.

Plot
The story starts when Leonard Morley receives a threatening note. Over time more of these notes turn up, and when the fourth has found its way to Morley, he resolves to tell his manager, William Whiteley. Before Morley can speak to him, Whiteley is shot and killed. In the end, Horace Rayner is charged with murder, Morley testifies at the trial, and Rayner is sentenced to life imprisonment.

Reception
Patrick Skene Catling praised the novel in the Evening Standard, writing, "Her last novel is up to her usual standard — humane, world wise and gently witty." 
 In a positive review for The Daily Telegraph, Kirsty Milne said, "Monica Dickens evokes the age of corsets and chloroform without slipping too far into the nostalgia trap. Her tendency to jump between a large cast of characters sometimes leaves the novel a little unfocused, but her brisk energy supplies a narrative drive of its own."

Jessica Mann stated in The Sunday Telegraph, "The plot concerns the actual murder of William Whiteley, of the Queensway store; but this is not a murder story. It is a rambling tale of an extended family. Although the cast is a few steps down in cast from Galsworthy's characters, we are in Forsyte territory."

References

1993 British novels
Novels published posthumously
Viking Press books
Novels set in London
Novels set in the 1900s